Belle is a 1973 Belgian-French drama film directed by André Delvaux. It was entered into the 1973 Cannes Film Festival.

Plot
The aging romancier Mathieu Grégoire falls in love with a female stranger who doesn't even understand his language. Their uncommon relationship upsets his family.

Cast
 Jean-Luc Bideau as Mathieu Grégoire
 Danièle Delorme as Jeanne
 Adriana Bogdan as Belle
 Roger Coggio as Victor
 René Hainaux as the deputy
 Stéphane Excoffier as Marie
 John Dobrynine as John
 Valerio Popesco as the stranger
 François Beukelaers as the false stranger
 André Blavier as Vincent
 Marc Audier as the café owner
 Arlette Emmery as the presenter
 Suzanne Gohy as the mother
 Yvette Merlin as the boss at the 'Joités'

References

External links

1973 films
1970s French-language films
1973 drama films
Films directed by André Delvaux
Films scored by Frédéric Devreese
Belgian drama films
French drama films
French-language Belgian films
1970s French films